Visceral Evisceration was an Austrian metal band that blended gothic metal and death-doom. They were one of the first extreme metal bands to include female operatic vocals, contrasted by male grunts and clear vocals. Their songs are generally long and epic, combining slow doom riffs with mid-paced gothic metal. Lyrically, they focused on issues more prevalent in goregrind. After a demo, they released their sole album, Incessant Desire for Palatable Flesh, on Napalm Records. After the release of the album, they left Napalm and changed their name to As I Lay Dying (not to be confused with the US namesake), releasing a promo in 1995 before breaking up.

Discography 
Savour of the Seething Meat (Demo, 1993)
Incessant Desire for Palatable Flesh (Album, Napalm, 1994)
Promo 1995 (Demo, 1995) (as As I Lay Dying)

Members 
Hannes Wuggenig - guitar, vocals
Jürgen Hajek - guitar
Dominik Lirsch - bass
Stephan Sternad - drums

References

External links
 Metal archives entry

Austrian heavy metal musical groups
Doom metal musical groups
Musical groups established in 1991
Musical groups disestablished in 1995
Musical quartets
1991 establishments in Austria